Viatcheslav Fyodorovich Mukhanov (born October 2, 1956) is a Soviet/Russian born German theoretical physicist and cosmologist. He is best known for the theory of Quantum Origin of the Universe Structure. Working in 1980-1981 with Gennady Chibisov in the Lebedev Physical Institute in Moscow he predicted the spectrum of inhomogeneities in the Universe, which are originated from the initial quantum fluctuations. The numerous experiments in which there were measured the temperature fluctuations of the Cosmic Microwave Background Radiation are in excellent agreement with this theoretical prediction, thus confirming that the galaxies and their clusters originated from the initial quantum fluctuations. Later on Mukhanov proved that the results he obtained with G. Chibisov in 1981 are of the generic origin and he has developed the general consistent quantum cosmological perturbation theory.

Since 2006, Mukhanov is the Scientific Director of the Journal of Cosmology and Astroparticle Physics.

Awards
 Oskar Klein Medal, Stockholm University, Sweden (2006),
 Tomalla prize, Switzerland (2009)
 Blaise Pascal Chair, ENS, Paris, France (2011)
 Amaldi Medal (2012)
 Gruber Prize in Cosmology (2013)
 Friedrich Wilhelm Joseph von Schelling-Preis, Bavarian Academy of Sciences and Humanities, Germany (2014)
 Max Planck Medal (2015)
 BBVA Foundation Frontiers of Knowledge Award (2015) in Basic Sciences
 Dirac Medal, (ICTP) (2019)

Publications
Mukhanov, Viatcheslav and Chibisov Gennady: "Quantum fluctuations and a nonsingular Universe", JETP Lett, 33, No.10, 532 (1981), see also https://arxiv.org/abs/astro-ph/0303077
Mukhanov, V. F., and Feldman, H. A., and Brandenberger, R. H.: "Theory of Cosmological Perturbations", Physics Reports (1992)
Mukhanov, Viatcheslav,Physical Foundations of Cosmology, Cambridge University Press, 2005. 
Mukhanov, Viatcheslav and Winizki, Sergei,"Introduction to Quantum Effects in Gravity", Cambridge University Press, 2007.

See also
Ludwig Maximilian University of Munich

References

1956 births
Living people
Soviet physicists
20th-century Russian physicists
Russian cosmologists
Theoretical physicists
Moscow Institute of Physics and Technology alumni
Winners of the Max Planck Medal